The New Afrikan Black Panther Party (NABPP) is a Black Power Marxist–Leninist–Maoist organization in the United States, largely based out of the Red Onion State Prison in Wise County, Virginia and referred to as the New Afrikan Black Panther Party – Prison Chapter (NABPP-PC).

History
The party was founded in 2005 by Kevin Rashid Johnson and Shaka Zulu (born Zulu Sharod) also known as Shaka Sankofa Zulu, with support from Native American activist Tom Big Warrior. The party also claims continuity with the Black Panther prison chapter as developed by George Jackson and W. L. Nolen in 1971.

Party leaders were active in the 2016 U.S. prison strike and claimed retribution from prison authorities for their involvement.

Shaka Zulu was released from prison in 2019. Since his release, the NABPP has been organizing "No Prison Fridays" protests in Newark. The NABPP is also organizing "Serve the People" programs to assist communities in developing their own resources and labor power toward restoring them as base areas of cultural, political and economic revolution.

In recent years, the NABPP has built the "United Panther Movement" (UPM) which involves "parallel constellations of activists from all races and genders". The United Panther Movement includes other minor communist parties such as the Red Heart Warrior Society, the White Panther Organization, the Brown Panther Organizing Committee, the New Afrikan Service Organization (formerly The Black Brigade) and the Old South Organizing Committee.

In January 2021, FBI agents interviewed Shaka Zulu on involvement in the Capitol attack; Zulu denied any involvement and considered the interview "harassment." Moira Meltzer-Cohen of the National Lawyers Guild viewed the interview as part of wider attempts by the FBI to target left-wing organizations following the Capitol attack.

2020 split
In December 2020, supporters of Kevin "Rashid" Johnson split off from NABPP and began using the name Revolutionary Intercommunal Black Panther Party (RIBPP). Johnson cited displeasure with the NBPP leadership, lack of internal democracy, and ideological differences as causing the split.

Ideology
According to the party's founder and current leader, Shaka Zulu, the NABPP's ideology is Pantherism, which is an ideology illuminated by Marxism–Leninism–Maoism. He asserts that Pantherism is "a fighting ideology talking about confiscating the wealth of the super-rich exploiters, the bourgeoisie, through a revolutionary war of liberation". Zulu also stated that Pantherism opposes Black bourgeois nationalism and American reactionary patriotism, with a Maoist world outlook and international proletarian socialism.

The NABPP claims to follow the "class-based ideological line of the original Black Panther Party" while rejecting the "race-based, anti-white" politics of the New Black Panther Party.

References

External links 
 

Black Panther Party
Black political parties in the United States
Black Power
Communist parties in the United States
Anti-racist organizations in the United States
Anti-revisionist organizations
Far-left politics in the United States
Maoist parties in the United States
Post–civil rights era in African-American history
Prison-related organizations
2005 establishments in the United States
Organizations based in Virginia